LNJ or lnj may refer to:

 Liberty N' Justice, an American Christian hard rock band
 LNJ, the IATA code for Lincang Airport, Yunnan Province, China
 lnj, the ISO 639-3 code for Linngithigh dialect, a defunct Paman language formerly spoken in Queensland, Australia